Nur Hisham Adam (born 24 April 1968) is a former Singaporean male sepak takraw player. He represented Singapore in 4 editions of the Asian Games and won five bronze medals.

References 

1968 births
Living people
Singaporean sportsmen
Sepak takraw players at the 1990 Asian Games
Sepak takraw players at the 1994 Asian Games
Sepak takraw players at the 1998 Asian Games
Sepak takraw players at the 2002 Asian Games
Medalists at the 1990 Asian Games
Medalists at the 1994 Asian Games
Medalists at the 1998 Asian Games
Medalists at the 2002 Asian Games
Asian Games bronze medalists for Singapore
Asian Games medalists in sepak takraw
Sepak takraw players